Astrocaryum jauari is the most frequently encountered palm native to Amazon Rainforest vegetation in the floodplains of the Rio Negro, in Brazil. Its fruits are edible. This plant has further commercial value because it may be used in the production of heart of palm.

External links
 Astrocaryum jauari

jauari
Trees of the Amazon
Tropical agriculture
Trees of Bolivia
Trees of Peru
Trees of Venezuela
Trees of Colombia
Trees of Brazil
Trees of Guyana
Trees of Suriname
Trees of Ecuador
Trees of French Guiana
Taxa named by Carl Friedrich Philipp von Martius